The members of the 20th Knesset were elected on 17 March 2015 and sworn in on 31 March 2015.

Members of the Knesset

Replacements
The twentieth Knesset had the highest number of replacements in Israeli history, with at least 27 members leaving mid-term. Eleven of those left due to the Norwegian Law.

See also
Thirty-fourth government of Israel

References

External links
Current Knesset Members of the Twentieth Knesset Knesset website

 
20